The women's 4 × 100 metre medley relay competition of the swimming events at the 1999 Pan American Games took place on August 6 at the Pan Am Pool. The last Pan American Games champion was the United States.

Results
All times are in minutes and seconds.

Heats

Final 
The final was held on August 6.

References

Swimming at the 1999 Pan American Games
1999 in women's swimming